Christian Vietoris (born 1 April 1989) is a German racing driver. He competed in the Deutsche Tourenwagen Masters, most recently for HWA Team. Vietoris has also been a part of the revitalized Mercedes-Benz Junior Team, together with Robert Wickens and Roberto Merhi. Vietoris made his debut in the DTM in 2011, driving for Persson Motorsport, before being promoted to HWA for the 2012 DTM season.

Career

Karting

Vietoris started his career through karting, the most common entry point for all racing drivers, in 1994. Nine years after starting his karting career, the young German was the national Junior Kart champion and a year later came second Western German Karting Championship.

Formula BMW

In 2005, Vietoris moved up to Formula BMW ADAC with Eifelland Racing. Vietoris finished his first FBMW campaign sixteenth in the Drivers' Championship with fifteen points, sharing his position with fellow German Dominik Wasem. In 2006, Vietoris moved to Josef Kaufmann Racing, where he won the Drivers' Championship with 277 points and taking nine race wins, his nearest rival being Finland's Mika Mäki. As well as his German FBMW title, Vietoris won the Formula BMW World Final, ahead of other FBMW champions such as Robert Wickens, the 2006 US FBMW champion, and the British Formula BMW champion, Niall Breen, winning himself a test for the BMW Sauber F1 team.

Following his impressive performances in Formula BMW, Vietoris was picked by A1 Team Germany to replace Nico Hülkenberg for the Mexican round of the 2006–07 season.

Formula Three

In 2007, Vietoris competed in the ATS Formel 3 Cup for Josef Kaufmann Racing, finishing in fifth. He moved on to the Formula Three Euroseries in 2008 for Mücke Motorsport. He had a solid season, ending up eighth in the championship with one win coming at the Norisring. He set a pair of fastest laps – at Mugello and Brands Hatch – and was on pole at the Nürburgring.

He continued in the F3 Euroseries in 2009 with Mücke Motorsport, finishing as runner-up to the dominant Jules Bianchi. Vietoris won four races over the course of the season, adding a further four podiums and a fastest lap at Brands once again, as he helped keep Mücke in contention for the teams title until he left for GP2 Asia.

GP2 Series
Vietoris missed the final round of the F3 Euroseries season to join up with the DAMS team for a GP2 Asia Series test at the Yas Marina Circuit in Abu Dhabi. He raced in the 2009–10 season for the team. He moved to Racing Engineering for the 2010 main series, winning one race en route to ninth place in the drivers' championship. He missed the final round of the season due to appendicitis; his seat was taken by Ho-Pin Tung.

Vietoris remains with Racing Engineering for the 2011 GP2 Series season, alongside Dani Clos. After crashing heavily during the first round of the season at Istanbul, he complained of recurring headaches and was replaced by Álvaro Parente until he recovered and returned to the cockpit in Valencia. At Spa-Francorchamps, he took his first series pole position and converted it into victory, also setting his first fastest lap in the process. He also won the sprint race finale at Monza, rising to seventh in the drivers' championship.

DTM

Vietoris made his debut in the DTM, dovetailing his 2011 GP2 campaign with a season driving a Persson Motorsport Mercedes in the Deutsche Tourenwagen Masters. His best result as a rookie was a 5th place at Oschersleben. Another highlight was reaching the semi-final at the non-points Showevent at the Olympic Stadium in München.

On 3 April 2012 Mercedes announced the revival of the Mercedes-Benz Junior Team that has guided several notable drivers in their racing careers like Heinz-Harald Frentzen, Karl Wendlinger and Michael Schumacher. With that announcement came the news that Vietoris, together with the reigning Formula 3 Euroseries champion Roberto Merhi and the reigning Formula Renault 3.5 Series champion Robert Wickens, would become a part of the new Junior Team and that the three of them would drive for the Junior Team in the 2012 DTM season.

7-time F1 World Champion Michael Schumacher was to be involved with the three drivers by serving as a mentor. Driving under the Junior Team-moniker meant for Vietoris that he would switch teams for his sophomore season in the DTM, trading in his place at Persson Motorsport for the elite team of Mercedes in the DTM, HWA Team, replacing Bruno Spengler, who left Mercedes for BMW.

Records
Vietoris is the youngest driver ever to win an A1 Grand Prix race. He took the chequered flag during the 2007–08 A1 Grand Prix of Nations, New Zealand at Taupo Motorsport Park at just 18 years, nine months and 19 days old, beating the previous record for youngest A1GP winner by exactly five months. That record was held by the team's former driver, Nico Hülkenberg, who won on his debut at Zandvoort in 2006.

Racing record

Career summary

Complete Formula 3 Euro Series results
key) (Races in bold indicate pole position) (Races in italics indicate fastest lap)

† Driver did not finish the race, but was classified as he completed over 90% of the race distance.

Complete A1 Grand Prix results
(key) (Races in bold indicate pole position) (Races in italics indicate fastest lap)

Complete GP2 Series results
(key) (Races in bold indicate pole position) (Races in italics indicate fastest lap)

Complete GP2 Asia Series results
(key) (Races in bold indicate pole position) (Races in italics indicate fastest lap)

Complete DTM results
(key) (Races in bold indicate pole position) (Races in italics indicate fastest lap)

† Driver retired, but was classified as they completed 75% of the winner's race distance.

References

External links

  
 

1989 births
Living people
People from Gerolstein
Racing drivers from Rhineland-Palatinate
Formula BMW ADAC drivers
German racing drivers
Formula 3 Euro Series drivers
A1 Team Germany drivers
GP2 Asia Series drivers
GP2 Series drivers
Deutsche Tourenwagen Masters drivers
Blancpain Endurance Series drivers
Eifelland Racing drivers
Josef Kaufmann Racing drivers
Mücke Motorsport drivers
DAMS drivers
Racing Engineering drivers
HWA Team drivers
Mercedes-AMG Motorsport drivers
Strakka Racing drivers
A1 Grand Prix drivers
Super Nova Racing drivers
Nürburgring 24 Hours drivers